Moses Lindo was a British indigo sorter, merchant, planter and Inspector General of Indigo, Drugs & Dyes in the Province of South Carolina.

Early life 
Moses Lindo was the son of Elias Lindo (1690-1727), a broker on the Royal Exchange, and Rachel Lopes Fereira. He was a grandson of Isaac Lindo, one of the earliest Jewish brokers of London (1681).

Career 
He was involved in the Cochineal and Indigo trade at the Royal Exchange in London before moving to Charleston, South Carolina in November 1756. He specialised in fabric dyes.

His advertisements began appearing in the South Carolina Gazette during 1756. He became a wealthy planter and ranked among the prominent merchants of Charleston. He was instrumental in the development of indigo industry in South Carolina where it became one of the most important industries. He helped to establish the reputation of Carolina indigo and procure a subsidy from Parliament of the United Kingdom.

Indigo became the second largest revenue crop after rice, bringing great wealth to the colony. From his arrival in Charleston until his death in 1774, indigo production increased fivefold, to more than one million pounds annually.

In 1757, he sold the Lindo Packett to John Gordon.

In 1762 he was appointed "Surveyor and Inspector-General of Indigo, Drugs, and Dyes".  Lindo affixed a special seal to each parcel he inspected.  

Jonas Phillips worked off his passage to the U.S. as an indentured servant to Lindo.

In a letter published in the Royal Society’s Philosophical Transactions for 1763, Lindo announced the invention of “a superior crimson dye” derived from pokeberries. He also claimed to have used a concoction of pokeberries, tobacco, and Roman vitriol to cure yaws, an infectious skin disease common in the crowded slave quarters.

The archives of Brown University provides a record of its transaction with Lindo on September 6, 1770.

“The sum of twenty pounds having been reported as a subscription from Mr. Moses Lindo… it was thereupon ‘Voted, That the children of Jews may be admitted into this Institution, and entirely enjoy the freedom of their own religion without any restraint or imposition whatever. And that the Chancellor and President do write to Mr. Moses Lindo of Charleston, South Carolina, and give him information of this resolution.’"

Moses had written a letter explaining that if their admissions policy was indeed as he had been informed, “my donation shall exceed beyond the bounds of th’ir imagination.”

On August 20, 1772, he published a letter to Henry Laurens explaining his reasons for refusing to continue to act as Inspector-General of Indigo, Drugs & Dyes.

The South Carolina Gazette (March 15, 1773) states that Lindo purchased a stone which he believed to be a topaz of immense size, and that he sent it to London by the Lord Charles Montagu to be presented to The Queen of England.

Moses was shipping more than one million pounds a year from Beresford Wharf on the Cooper River before the American Revolution. He was reputed to be the largest exporter of indigo north of Kingston, Jamaica.

Popular culture 
The character Solomon Lindo, played by Allan Hawco in The Book of Negroes (miniseries) is based on Moses Lindo.

References 

British merchants
Living people